The Honda Civic Classic was a golf tournament on the LPGA Tour in 1975 and from 1977 to 1980. It was played at the Whispering Palms Country Club in Rancho Santa Fe, California in 1975 and 1977 and at the Rancho Bernardo Inn in San Diego, California from 1978 to 1980.

Winners
Honda Civic Golf Classic
1980 JoAnne Carner

Honda Civic Classic
1979 JoAnne Carner

Kathryn Crosby/Honda Civic Classic
1978 Sally Little
1977 Sandra Palmer

Golf Inns of America
1976 No tournament
1975 Mary Bea Porter

References

Former LPGA Tour events
Golf in California
Sports competitions in San Diego
Women's sports in California